NGC 1990 was discovered by William Herschel in 1786 with an 18.7 inch telescope.  However, there is doubt that this object exists in reality as several visual searches and modern astrophotography have failed to identify the exact location and extent of the reflection nebula.  Modern photographs of the area with cameras show ultraviolet leak that gives the false impression of a large blue nebula around ε Ori (Alnilam). More careful photography does not reveal a nebula in the area.

References

External links 
 

NGC 1990
1990
Orion (constellation)